Gayabari railway station serves the village of Gayabari in West Bengal, India. It is part of the Darjeeling Himalayan Railway It has a platform which was built between 1879 and 1881. The Darjeeling Himalayan Railway is a UNESCO  World Heritage Site.

The station lies in the Katihar railway division

References 

Railway stations in Darjeeling district